Vice Admiral Peter John Wilkinson,  (born 28 May 1956) is a retired senior Royal Navy officer who served as Deputy Chief of Defence Staff (Personnel) from 2007 to 2010. He was National President of the Royal British Legion from 2012 until 2016.

Early life
Wilkinson was born on 28 May 1956. He was educated at the Royal Grammar School, High Wycombe, and the University of Wales, Lampeter, graduating with a Bachelor of Arts in 1978.

Military career
Wilkinson joined the Royal Navy in 1975, where he initially served in submarines. He commanded the submarines HMS Otter, Superb, and Vanguard, being promoted to captain in 1995. He was captain of the 2nd Submarine Squadron from 1999 to 2001.

Wilkinson was the Director of Naval Service and Conditions (as a commodore) from 2001, and then Naval Secretary and Director-General Human Resources (Navy) from 2004. From 2005 to 2007 he was Defence Services Secretary and Assistant Chief of Defence Staff (Personnel and Reserves). He was promoted to vice admiral and appointed as Deputy Chief of the Defence Staff (Personnel) in August 2007. Wilkinson was appointed a Companion of the Order of the Bath in the 2010 Birthday Honours, and retired in August 2010.

Later life
In retirement Wilkinson became chairman of Seafarers UK, a charity supporting seafarers in need and their dependants across the Royal Navy, Merchant Navy and Fishing Fleets, and Clerk of the Worshipful Company of Cooks. He is a trustee of the Armed Forces Memorial appeal, which has built a new memorial to service personnel who have lost their lives on duty. The memorial is located at the National Memorial Arboretum in Staffordshire. After the resignation of Lieutenant General Sir John Kiszely, he was appointed National President of the Royal British Legion in October 2012 and served until May 2016.

References

|-

|-

|-

 

Living people
Royal Navy vice admirals
1956 births
Royal Navy submarine commanders
Companions of the Order of the Bath
Commanders of the Royal Victorian Order
People educated at the Royal Grammar School, High Wycombe
Alumni of the University of Wales, Lampeter
Royal Navy logistics officers